The 1936 The Citadel Bulldogs football team represented The Citadel, The Military College of South Carolina in the 1936 college football season.  Tatum Gressette served as head coach for the fifth season.  The Bulldogs played home games at Johnson Hagood Stadium.  The 1936 season marked the Bulldogs' first year as  members of the Southern Conference.

Schedule

References

Citadel
Citadel
The Citadel Bulldogs football seasons
Citadel Bulldogs football